Shirinag (also Romanized as Shīrīnag; also known as Shīrīnak) is a village in Golzar Rural District, in the Central District of Bardsir County, Kerman Province, Iran. At the 2006 census, its population was 789, in 176 families.

References 

Populated places in Bardsir County